José Alonso (11 May 1919 – 4 December 1988) was a Spanish sports shooter. He competed in the 25 m pistol event at the 1948 Summer Olympics.

References

External links
 

1919 births
1988 deaths
Spanish male sport shooters
Olympic shooters of Spain
Shooters at the 1948 Summer Olympics
Sportspeople from the Province of Córdoba (Spain)
20th-century Spanish people